The flagfin cardinalfish (Jaydia truncata) is a species of ray-finned fish from the cardinalfish family, Apogonidae. It is an Indo-Pacific species which is found from the Red Sea and the Persian Gulf to Australia and Japan. It is the type species of the genus Jaydia.

References

truncata
Fish described in 1855